The Sivalik Hills, also known as the Shivalik Hills and Churia Hills, are a mountain range of the outer Himalayas that stretches over about  from the Indus River eastwards close to the Brahmaputra River, spanning the northern parts of the Indian subcontinent. "Sivalik" literally means 'tresses of Shiva'. Sivalik region is home to the Soanian archaeological culture.

Geology
Geologically, the Sivalik Hills belong to the Tertiary deposits of the outer Himalayas. They are chiefly composed of sandstone and conglomerate rock formations, which are the solidified detritus of the Himalayas to their north; they are poorly consolidated. The remnant magnetisation of siltstones and sandstones indicates that they were deposited 16–5.2 million years ago. In Nepal, the Karnali River exposes the oldest part of the Shivalik Hills.

They are bounded on the south by a fault system called the Main Frontal Thrust, with steeper slopes on that side.  Below this, the coarse alluvial Bhabar zone makes the transition to the nearly level plains.  Rainfall, especially during the summer monsoon, percolates into the Bhabar, then is forced to the surface by finer alluvial layers below it in a zone of springs and marshes along the northern edge of the Terai or plains.

Prehistory 

Remains of the Lower Paleolithic Soanian culture dating to around 500,000 to 125,000 BP were found in the Sivalik region. Contemporary to the Acheulean, the Soanian culture is named after the Soan Valley in the Sivalik Hills of Pakistan. The Soanian archaeological culture is found across Sivalik region in present-day India, Nepal and Pakistan.

Sivapithecus (a kind of ape, formerly known as Ramapithecus) is among many fossil finds in the Sivalik region.

A number of fossil ratites were reported from the Sivalik Hills, including the extinct Asian ostrich, Dromaius sivalensis and Hypselornis. However, the latter two species were named only from toe bones that have since been identified as belonging to an ungulate mammal and a crocodilian, respectively.

Demographics 
The low human population density in the Sivalik Hills and along the steep southern slopes of the Lower Himalayan Range created a cultural, linguistic, and political buffer zone between populations in the plains to the south and the hills beyond the Mahabharat escarpment, enabling different evolutionary paths with respect to language and culture.

In culture
The Indian Navy's Shivalik-class frigate is named after these ranges.

See also

 Subranges of Sivalik (from north to south)
 Dundwa Range
 Margalla Hills
 Shivalik Fossil Park
 Geological subdivisions of Himalayas (from north to south)  
 Indus-Yarlung suture zone
Karakoram fault system
Nyenchen Tanglha Mountains
Main Himalayan Thrust
 Lower/Lesser Himalaya
 Geographical subdivisions of Himalayas (from east to west)  
 Eastern Himalaya
 Indian Himalayan Region, Geology of Bhutan and Geology of Nepal
 Jammu and Kashmir (union territory), Geography of Ladakh, Gilgit-Baltistan and Geology of Pakistan

References

Mountain ranges of the Himalayas
Mountain ranges of Asia
Mountain ranges of Bhutan
Mountain ranges of India
Mountain ranges of Nepal
Mountain ranges of Pakistan
Hills of Jammu and Kashmir
Hills of Uttarakhand
Hills of Himachal Pradesh
Hills of Sikkim
Himalayan subtropical broadleaf forests